Adriana Garlobo (born 28 October 1988) is a Cuban water polo player.

She competed at the 2007 World Aquatics Championships , 2014 Central American and Caribbean Games,  2015 Pan American Games.

References 

1988 births
Cuban water polo players
Living people